The Tupolev A-3 Aerosledge is an all-metal amphibious aerosledge, designed to transport passengers and light freight in remote areas of the Soviet Union. Officially known as the A-3 "Hope" ("Nadezhda" in Russian), it uses a single pusher propeller mounted behind the enclosed cabin to propel the craft over snow or water.

History
Year-round transportation of mail, passengers, and light freight has always been a problem in remote areas of Siberia and Eastern Europe. Many communities are surrounded by deep snow, hummock ice, marshes that remain unfrozen, and natural waterways choked by weeds. The constantly changing conditions faced by these communities required the development of a vehicle capable of traveling over a widely varied surface at high speeds in order to deliver mail and supplies, as well to transport passengers, and provide emergency medical relief and evacuation to hospitals. To satisfy these requirements, the Tupolev Design Bureau developed an amphibious aerosledge with the appearance of a speedboat, powered by a single radial engine mounted behind the cabin in a pusher configuration. Development of the A-3 began in 1961, with the first production A-3 being delivered in 1964. Production of the A-3 continued until the early 1980s. Though early production A-3's were manufactured near Moscow, the majority of A-3 production took place in Ukraine, at the Tyachivski Transcarpathian helicopter plant. By the time production ceased in 1983 over 800 A-3 Aerosledges had been produced. Around the same time, Nikolay Kamov developed the similar but larger Aerosled K30.

Design
The A-3 Aerosledge has a hull built of riveted metal alloy construction using 2mm D-16T plates and profiles. The craft's ribs, stringers and plates are also of D-16 Duraluminium. Transverse bulkheads divide the craft into three watertight compartments. The craft will remain afloat with one flooded compartment. Double plating is employed for the hull bottom to strengthen it for crossing ice and snow. Low friction 3.5 mm polyethylene is attached to the bottom plates, and is removable for repair. Three stainless-steel runners are mounted to the hull base to provide the craft with the ability to maintain an even course, and prevent sideslipping on ice. The smooth lines of the hull's underside allow it to traverse bodies of water choked with weeds without difficulty.  Even with a maximum payload, the Aerosledge has a draft of no more than 2 inches.  The cabin is fully enclosed with a seating capacity of five in passenger configuration. In standard mail-carrying configuration, the cabin has one swiveling seat for the driver/mail carrier, and a cargo capacity of 1,433 lbs over ice, and 661 lbs over water.  Cabin access is by two gull-wing doors. There is an additional baggage storage compartment in front of the cabin, located beneath a hermetically-sealed hatch. The craft is controlled by a single wheel connected to twin rudders located behind the propeller. If the wheel is pulled towards the driver both rudders fold outward, forming a brake. If turned and pulled toward the driver, only one rudder folds outward, giving greater turning control over water overgrown with reeds or weeds.  When traversing snow, the slightly upturned bow of the A-3, together with the differences in pressure between the upper and lower surfaces of the hull, generate an aerodynamic lifting force. At speeds above 50 mph aerodynamic lift reduces the pressure exerted by the craft against the surface by one third. As the depth of the furrow decreases, friction resistance is reduced accordingly. On water the large area of the lower hull, with its small keel, makes it an ideal shallow-draft watercraft.

Propulsion
The A-3 was originally powered by a  M-11 five-cylinder air-cooled radial engine. On later models this was replaced by a  AI-14R radial mounted on a shock-absorbing tubular frame. A removable cowling covers the oil tank and pipes for the lubrication system. The twin fuel tanks are concealed within the hull on either side of the cabin. Fuel caps are located in wells in the deck.

Operation
Used primarily for mail delivery, and to transport essential supplies and medicine, the A-3 was common throughout Eastern Europe, and remote areas of Siberia. A-3's were in service from the mid-1960s until the 1980s.

The A-3 was also used in limited military service, with at least one being based with the Soviet 16th Air Army in East Germany as a rescue craft for downed pilots. Two A3's were also based with the 125 ADIB (fighter-bomber division) at Rechlin. The Hungarian Border Patrol operated four aerosledges at Lake Neusiedl.

Survivors

 A 1978 A-3, registered N007 (possibly the only one imported to the U.S.), was offered at a Barrett-Jackson auction in 2007,  The craft had a non-standard nine-cylinder engine, and two counter-rotating propellers. This A-3 was sold at Barrett-Jackson's 2015 Scottsdale auction for $220,000 and again at the 2020 edition of the same auction for $143,000.
 In Hungary, there are two A-3 units, registered "2202" and "2302". The "2202" has been restored and is located at the Border Patrol Museum in Körmend (no pictures showing the number), while the "2302" is at Alsónémedi, still in disrepair.
 A A-3 with the registration "6711" is located in the Moscow car museum.
 A 1961 "N007" was offered for sale at the 2015 Euro Auto Festival in Greenville, SC on October 16, 2015. This particular craft, beautifully restored, was started as part of a demonstration and ran flawlessly. Included in the sale was the trailer it sat on, complete with spare prop and compressed air cylinders to provide starting. The whole package was offered for $200,000 US. 
 One example in need of repair is located in the Russian mining settlement Barentsburg in Svalbard.

See also
 Aerosani
 Airboat
 KRISTI snowcat

Notes

References
 McLeavy, Roy, (1982) "Jane's Surface Skimmers", London, England: Jane's Publishing Company Limited, pp 65–67. 
 Walter Lorch, (1977) "Geschichte des Verkehrs auf Schnee und Eis" Orell Düssli Verkag Zürich, page 143.

External links

 N007 Tupolev, aerosled with ground effect 'The remarkable part boat, part sled, part ground-effect Tupelov(sic) aerosled' gizmag.com/newatlas.com
 Aerosani-amfibiya AS-2, a modern amphibious recreational vehicle from aircraft manufacturer Tupolev (Russian language)
 "REPÜLŐMÚZEUM SZOLNOK Tupoljev A-3 "Aeroszan" amfíbia" (Hungarian -tr. MUSEUM OF FLIGHT Szolnok: Tupolev A-3 "Aerosan" amphibian) a page of the Museum of Hungarian Aviation in Szolnok, with some pictures of the aerosledges, showing them in Budaörs, and in their new location
 Kamov AEROSLED K30 (VINTAGE SLEDS IN RUSSIA)

Snowmobiles
Soviet inventions
 
Soviet Air Force
Rescue equipment